Herminiimonas arsenicoxydans is a species of ultramicrobacteria. First reported in 2006, it was isolated from industrial sludge and is able to oxidise the toxic chemical element arsenic.

References

External links
Type strain of Herminiimonas arsenicoxydans at BacDive -  the Bacterial Diversity Metadatabase

Burkholderiales
Bacteria described in 2006